The Northwest Sumatra–Barrier Islands languages (also Barrier Islands–Batak languages or Sumatran languages) are a group of Malayo-Polynesian languages spoken by the Batak and related peoples in the interior of North Sumatra and by the Nias, Mentawai people, and others on the Barrier islands (Simeulue, Nias, and Mentawai Islands Regency) off the western coast of Sumatra, Indonesia.

Classification
The languages of the Northwest Sumatra–Barrier Islands subgroup are:

Gayo
Batak languages
Simeulue
Nias–Sikule
Mentawai
Enggano (?)

This subgroup was first proposed by Lafeber (1922), who called it "Batak-Nias". Nothofer (1986) presented lexical and phonological evidence in support of this subgroup, calling it "Barrier Islands–Batak".

The position of the highly divergent Enggano language is controversial. Both Lafeber (1922) and Nothofer (1986) include Enggano as a probable daughter language. This is rejected by Edwards (2015) who considers Enggano a primary branch of the Malayo-Polynesian languages. Recent research by Smith (2017) however supports the inclusion of Enggano within his tentative "Sumatran" subgroup, which is an extended version of Northwest Sumatra–Barrier Islands that further includes the Nasal language spoken in Bengkulu in southwestern Sumatra. Smith's proposal is supported by Billings & McDonnell (2022) who classify the Sumatran languages as follows:

Batak languages
 Northern Barrier Islands (Simeulue)
 Central Barrier Islands (Sikule, Nias)
 Mentawai
Gayo
Nasal
Enggano

As phonological evidence for the inclusion of these languages with the Sumatran subgroup they propose:

Mergers
PMP *j, *g > Proto-Sumatran *g
PMP *z, *d > Proto-Sumatran *d
PMP *ñ, *n > Proto-Sumatran *n
PMP *R, *r > Proto-Sumatran *r
PMP *h > Proto-Sumatran zero

Shift (sound change)
PMP *q > Proto-Sumatran *h

Lexicon
Edwards (2015: 78) provides the following table comparing body part vocabulary items across various languages of the Barrier Islands. Edwards (2015: 89) considers the aberrant Enggano language as not part of the Barrier Islands-Batak languages.

Proto-Sumatran lexical innovations listed by Billings & McDonnell (2022) are:

References

 
Sumatran languages
North Sumatra